Ongaro is an Italian surname. Notable people with the surname include:

Alberto Ongaro (1925–2018), Italian journalist, writer and comics writer
Alex Ongaro (born 1963), Canadian cyclist
Easton Ongaro (born 1998), Canadian soccer player
Fabio Ongaro (born 1977), Italian rugby player
Ornella Ongaro (born 1990), French motorcycle racer
Raimundo Ongaro (1924̣–2016), Argentine union leader
Ross Ongaro (born 1959), Canadian soccer player
Saúl Ongaro (1916–2004), Argentine footballer

See also
Francesco Dall'Ongaro (1808–1873), Italian writer, poet and dramatist

Italian-language surnames